"Miss You" is a popular song written by Jake Schulze and Rami Yacoub. It was originally recorded as a ballad, by the Irish boy band Westlife, but was never released as a single. In 2008, it was remade as a dance track by Swedish musician Basshunter becoming a hit single for him as "I Miss You" in 2008, notably in UK, Germany and Sweden.

Westlife song
The original song "Miss You" appeared on Irish boy band Westlife's 1999 debut album, Westlife. Although the album produced five different singles "Swear It Again", "If I Let You Go", "Flying Without Wings", the double A-side "I Have a Dream" / "Seasons in the Sun" all in 1999 and "Fool Again" and a remake of "More Than Words" both released in 2000, the song "Miss You" was never released as a single. The Westlife version heavily uses the sound of Irish instruments such as Fiddles and Bagpipes, making up a strong Irish sound. Moreover, the version is structured starting very soft and low until raising to soaring melody, leaving an anthem-like feel. The song charted in Ireland despite not being released as a single. It peaked at 96.

Basshunter version

Nearly a decade later, the Swedish musician Basshunter made a cover version of the song as a dance track retitling it as "I Miss You". Basshunter's track "I Miss You" featured lead vocals by the UK singer Lauren Dyson. It appeared on his 2008 album, Now You're Gone – The Album. The track was released as his fifth single from the album following "Now You're Gone" released in 2007, "All I Ever Wanted", Please Don't Go, a cover of KC and the Sunshine Band and "Angel in the Night" all in 2008. The Basshunter single was released on 14 December 2008 and peaked at number 32 on the UK Singles Chart. The song also charted in Germany and Sweden.

Music video
The music video was added to Hard2Beat's YouTube channel on 5 November 2008 and features a Christmas theme.

Picking up where Aylar and Basshunter left off in "Angel in the Night", "I Miss You" is set amongst the mountains of Norway in a beautiful log cabin. Aylar, Basshunter, and a gang of friends have the ultimate Christmas Day with presents, a jacuzzi, snow fights, and bikinis.

Chart performance

"I Miss You" entered the UK Singles Chart at number 86 on 14 December 2008 and peaked at number 32 week later. "I Miss You" debuted at number 46 on Swedish singles chart on 13 February 2009 and peaked at number 45 in its the last fourth week on chart. In Ireland it didn't enter the Irish singles chart but reached number one on the dance chart.

Track listing
 2-track CD single
 "I Miss You" (Radio Edit)
 "Basshunter Megamix"

 Maxi CD single
 "I Miss You" (Radio Edit)
 "I Miss You" (Fonzerelli Edit)
 "I Miss You" (Album Edit)
 "I Miss You" (Fonzerelli Remix)
 "I Miss You" (Headhunters Remix)
 "I Miss You" (Video) + other bonus content

Personnel
Credits

 Rami Jacobi – writer
 Jake Schulze – writer
 Basshunter – producer
 Scott Simons – producer
 Robert Uhlmann – producer
 Lauren Dyson – vocalist

Charts

References

External links
 

2008 singles
I Miss You
Songs written by Jake Schulze
Songs written by Rami Yacoub
1999 songs
Westlife songs
Torch songs
Songs about loneliness
1990s ballads
Pop ballads
I Miss You